New Creek is an  stream in eastern West Virginia, United States.  It is the third major West Virginia tributary to the North Branch Potomac River.  Via the Potomac, it is part of the watershed of Chesapeake Bay.

Course
New Creek rises on New Creek Mountain in northern Grant County and flows generally northeastwardly through western Mineral County, past the community of New Creek.  It joins the North Branch of the Potomac at the city of Keyser.

History
The creek was named after Peter New, an area pioneer.

Tributaries

Bridges

See also
List of West Virginia rivers

References

Rivers of Grant County, West Virginia
Rivers of Mineral County, West Virginia
Rivers of West Virginia
Tributaries of the Potomac River